Nicolas Raffault (born 24 September 1979) is a French rugby union footballer, currently playing for Lyon OU in the Top 14. His usual position is at Centre. Prior to joining Lyon OU he played for Stade Français where he won the Top 14 in 2000. He also played for Castres Olympique.

Honours 
 Top 14, 2000 with Stade Français
 Pro D2, 2011 with Lyon OU

References

External links
ERC stats

1979 births
Living people
Lyon OU players
French rugby union players
Stade Français players
Rugby union centres